Tazarkosh (also Romanized as Ţazarkash and Ţazar Kosh; also known as Tezīrkān, Ţaraz Kash, Ţarzkash, Tarzkosh, and Ţazar Gash) is a village in Ilat-e Qaqazan-e Gharbi Rural District, Kuhin District, Qazvin County, Qazvin Province, Iran. At the 2006 census, its population was 311, in 80 families.

References 

Populated places in Qazvin County